These are the official results of the Men's 5000 metres event at the 1999 IAAF World Championships in Seville, Spain. There were a total number of 37 participating athletes, with two qualifying heats and the final held on Saturday 28 August 1999 at 21:30h.

Medalists

Abbreviations
All times shown are in minutes:seconds:hundreds

Heats
Held on Wednesday 25 August 1999

Final

References
 IAAF
 todor66

H
5000 metres at the World Athletics Championships